Haoud El Hamra is a village in the commune of Hassi Messaoud, in Hassi Messaoud District, Ouargla Province, Algeria.

References

Neighbouring towns and cities

Populated places in Ouargla Province